R. Thompson's Island is a  alluvial island in the upper Allegheny River.  It is located in Watson Township, Warren County, Pennsylvania, and is part of the Allegheny Islands Wilderness.

Most of the trees on R. Thompson Island were destroyed during a local tornado in 1975.

References
Nature Tourism

Allegheny Islands Wilderness
Protected areas of Warren County, Pennsylvania
Landforms of Warren County, Pennsylvania
River islands of Pennsylvania
Islands of the Allegheny River in Pennsylvania